Heena Parmar is an Indian actress who works in Hindi television. She made her acting debut in 2011 with Haar Jeet where she portrayed Mihika Maansingh. Parmar is best known for her portrayal of Anarkali in Jodha Akbar and Rani Phool Bai Rathore in Bharat Ka Veer Putra – Maharana Pratap.

Parmar also portrayed Chanda Maurya in Chakravartin Ashoka Samrat, Madhavi Ranawat in Love Ka Hai Intezaar and ASP Aditi Sharma in Anjaan: Special Crimes Unit.

Career
Parmar made her acting debut in 2011 with Haar Jeet. From 2011 to 2012, she portrayed Mihika Maansingh in Haar Jeet and Saraswati Vishal Chaturvedi alongside Anshul Trivedi in Main Lakshmi Tere Aangan Ki.

In 2013, she portrayed Ishita Scindia in Punar Vivaah alongside Akshay Dogra. From 2013 to 2014, she played Haseena in Dil Jo Keh Na Saka. In 2014, she appeared in Itti Si Khushi as Akanksha and played Ragini in an episode of Ishq Kills.

In 2015, Parmar's portrayal of Anarkali in Jodha Akbar opposite Ravi Bhatia and Rani Phool Bai Rathore in Bharat Ka Veer Putra – Maharana Pratap opposite Sharad Malhotra, proved as a major turning point in her career.

In 2016, she portrayed Princess Chanda Maurya opposite Ankit Arora in Chakravartin Ashoka Samrat. She then portrayed Madhavi Madhav Ranawat in Love Ka Hai Intezaar in 2017.

Parmar portrayed ASP Aditi Sharma in 2018, opposite Gashmeer Mahajani in Anjaan: Special Crimes Unit. In 2019, she played Mohini / Malmal alongside Ankit Raj in Season 2 of Main Bhi Ardhangini.

In 2020, she portrayed Sona/Naagkanya in Ek Anokhi Rakshak - Naagkanya alongside Ankit Narang and appeared as Tulsi in Vighnaharta Ganesh.

Parmar played Payal Sharma in Aye Mere Humsafar from 2020 to 2021. She also appeared in the short film Between Youuuu & Meeee in 2022.

Filmography

Television

Film

References

External links
 

Indian television actresses
Indian soap opera actresses
21st-century Indian actresses
Living people
Year of birth missing (living people)